is a Japanese shōjo manga series by Miwako Sugiyama. Flower and the Beast was serialized in the bimonthly manga magazine Sho-Comi from August 2010 to December 2012. A live-action television drama adaptation ran in 2017, and a second season was broadcast in 2019.

Plot
Kumi Kumakura transfers to a new high school and is given five special teddy bears created by her deceased mother to give to her new friends. On the night before her first day, Kumi comes across Hyō Kakizono, who she befriends and gifts one of her teddy bears. Hyō steals her first kiss, and the two become attracted to each other. When Kumi starts attending school, she is shocked to discover that not only is Hyō her new classmate, but he is also one of the most popular boys in school who is well-known for being a playboy. Hyō, however, has fallen in love with Kumi, but she is unable to believe his words at face value and struggles to accept him.

Characters

 (movie comic); portrayed by Yurika Nakamura (live-action TV)

 (movie comic); portrayed by Yosuke Sugino (live-action TV)

 (movie comic); portrayed by Shouma Kai (live-action TV)

 (movie comic); portrayed by Takashi Matsuo (live-action TV)

 (movie comic); portrayed by Anna Iriyama (live-action TV)

Media

Manga
Flower and the Beast is written and illustrated by Miwako Sugiyama. It is serialized in the bimonthly magazine Sho-Comi from August 2010 to December 2012. The chapters were later released in 10 bound volumes by Shogakukan under the Flower Comics imprint.

M&C! licensed the series in English for Southeast Asian distribution.

Movie comic

A movie comic, featuring voiceovers to comic panels, was broadcast on dTV on August 1, 2016. The movie comic's theme song is "Nanairo Holiday" by Sky-Hi. A second movie comic was broadcast on March 20, 2019 to promote the second season of the live-action television series and featured "Snow Gift" by Tsubasa Sakiyama as the theme song.

Television drama

A live-action television series adaptation was announced in September 2017. The series stars Yurika Nakamura as Kumi, Yosuke Sugino as Hyō, Shouma Kai as Tatsuki, Bullet Train member Takashi Matsuo as Chihaya, and AKB48 member Anna Iriyama as Kanna. The television series was directed by Kentaro Otani and Ryō Miyawaki, with Miyako Matsumoto writing the script. The theme song for the series is "Waruguchi" by Da-ice. It was streamed exclusively on dTV and Fuji TV on Demand from October 30, 2017 to January 1, 2018. The series was later re-broadcast on Fuji TV's main television channel from April 24, 2018 to June 26, 2018.

A sequel titled Hana ni Kedamono: Second Season was released in 2019. The theme song is "Isshun no Onegai" by Da-ice.

Season 1 (2017)

Season 2 (2019)

Reception
In Japan, the manga sold a cumulative total of 2 million physical copies by 2017.
Volume 5 debuted at #16 on Oricon and sold  42,634  copies in its first week. Volume 8 debuted at #21 on Oricon and sold 41,320 copies in its first week.

References

External links
 Official television series website

2017 Japanese television series debuts
Japanese television dramas based on manga
Shōjo manga
Shogakukan manga